Ravnkilde is a small countryside town in Denmark with a population of 341 (1 January 2022), located in Rebild Municipality, North Jutland Region.

External links
  Ravnkildes official homepage (in Danish)

References

Cities and towns in the North Jutland Region
Rebild Municipality